The 2001 South Africa Sevens (more commonly known as the 2001 Durban Sevens) was an rugby sevens tournament held at the Absa Stadium in Durban. The tournament took place from the 17–18 November 2001 and was the third edition of the South Africa Sevens and was also the first leg of the 2001–02 World Sevens Series.

Sixteen teams was separated into four groups of four with the top two teams qualifying through to the cup final while the bottom two competed in the bowl. After finishing top of their group, New Zealand went on to defend their title defeating first-time cup finalists Samoa 19–17. In the plate final, Australia defeated Fiji 57–0 while the African teams in Namibia and Kenya won the bowl and the newly created shield competition.

Format
The teams were drawn into four pools of four teams each. Each team played the other teams in their pool once, with 3 points awarded for a win, 2 points for a draw, and 1 point for a loss (no points awarded for a forfeit). The pool stage was played on the first day of the tournament. The top two teams from each pool advanced to the Cup/Plate brackets. The bottom two teams from each pool went on to the Bowl bracket.

Teams
Arabian Gulf made their first appearance in the IRB Sevens World Series as they were one of the 16 participating teams for the tournament:

  Arabian Gulf

Pool stage
The pool stage was played on the first day of the tournament. The 16 teams were separated into four pools of four teams and teams in the same pool played each other once. The top two teams in each pool advanced to the Cup quarterfinals to compete for the 2001 Durban Sevens title.

Pool A

Source:

Pool B

Source:

Pool C

Source:

Pool D

Source:

Knockout stage

Shield

Source:

Bowl

Source:

Plate

Source:

Cup

Source:

Tournament placings

Source: Rugby7.com

References

South Africa
2001
2001 in South African rugby union